Sir John Oscar Cramer (18 February 189618 May 1994) was an Australian politician, representing the Liberal Party, of which he was a founding member.

Political career

Cramer was elected as Mayor of North Sydney in 1939 and served until his defeat as an alderman at the December 1941 municipal elections. From 1935 to 1956, Cramer served on the Sydney County Council (3rd/4th Constituency). In 1939 and 1945, he was elected Deputy Chairman, and was later elected for three terms as Chairman of the County Council (1946–1947; 1948–1950).

He was elected to the House of Representatives as the inaugural representative of the seat of Bennelong on its creation in 1949. In 1956, the Prime Minister Robert Menzies appointed him Minister for the Army, a portfolio he held until 1963.

On 23 January 1956, on his appointment as army minister Cramer resigned his 4th Constituency seat on the county council.

Cramer was the only Catholic in the Liberal Party parliamentary team, a fact Menzies would often joke about.

In 1964 he was created a Knight Bachelor. He retired from parliament before the 1974 election, and was succeeded by John Howard (later to become Prime Minister). He died on 18 May 1994, aged 98. Cramer had been the last serving parliamentarian born before Federation, and he was the last surviving former MP who was born in the 19th Century.

Personal life
In 1922 he married Mary Therese Earls, a teacher, and his elder by two and a half years. The couple had four children: John, Erle, Bronwyn and Leonie.  For her four decades of service as a charity worker and community activist, Lady Cramer was created a Dame Commander of the Order of the British Empire in 1971.

Dame Mary Cramer predeceased her husband by almost a decade, dying on 23 September 1984 (aged 91).

Writings

References

1896 births
1994 deaths
Politicians from Sydney
Deputy mayors of places in Australia
Mayors of North Sydney
Liberal Party of Australia members of the Parliament of Australia
Members of the Australian House of Representatives for Bennelong
Members of the Australian House of Representatives
Australian Knights Bachelor
Australian politicians awarded knighthoods
Australian Roman Catholics
20th-century Australian politicians
Councillors of Sydney County Council